Rodger Paul Davies (May 7, 1921 – August 19, 1974) was an American diplomat born in Berkeley, California, who was killed in the line of duty on August 19, 1974, in Nicosia, Cyprus, allegedly by Greek Cypriot gunmen during an anti-American demonstration outside the U.S. Embassy in Nicosia, sparked by the U.S's failure to stop the Turkish invasion of Cyprus.

He studied Economics at the University of California, Berkeley, before joining the U.S. Army in World War II. He undertook intensive language training in Arabic under Philip Khuri Hitti at Princeton University as part of the Army Specialized Training Program, promoted to the rank of Lieutenant, and then was deployed to the Middle East. He joined the state department after WWII.

Career
Davies was an American diplomat whose roles included director of the United States Department of State's Bureau of Near Eastern Affairs until October 1965. Then until 1970 he was Deputy Assistant Secretary of State for Near Eastern and South Asian Affairs. After Davies's death, President Ford appointed William R. Crawford Jr., as his successor.

Davies had been serving as the United States Ambassador to Cyprus since May 1973. It is alleged he was killed by Greek Cypriot gunmen during an anti-American demonstration outside the U.S. Embassy in Nicosia, where an estimated 300–600 Greek Cypriots were "demonstrating against the U.S.’s failure" to stop the Turkish invasion of Cyprus, which they perceived as the United States siding with Turkey.

Davies and Antoinette Varnavas, an embassy secretary and a Greek Cypriot national, were killed by sniper fire from a nearby building, believed to be gunmen from EOKA-B, a Greek Cypriot nationalist paramilitary organization whose goal was to unite Cyprus with Greece. Afterwards, the U.S. government "immediately" sent his replacement, Ambassador to Yemen William R. Crawford Jr., in order to demonstrate that "it was not blaming Greek-Cypriot authorities for the murder".

Personal life
Davies was born in Berkeley, California, on May 7, 1921 to John Leslie Davies and Catherine Paul Davies. He had an older brother, John Arthur Davies, and a younger sister, Catherine Davies Frakes. He studied Economics at the University of California, Berkeley, before joining the U.S. Army in World War II. He undertook intensive language training in Arabic under Philip Khuri Hitti at Princeton University as part of the Army Specialized Training Program, promoted to the rank of Lieutenant, and then was deployed to the Middle East. He joined the State Department after World War II. He then married Sarah Burgess,. She died in 1973, the year before he was killed. They had a daughter, Dana, and a son, John, who were 20 and 15 years old, respectively at the time of Davies's death.

See also
Cleo A. Noel Jr., the previous U.S. ambassador to die in the line of duty
Francis E. Meloy Jr., the next U.S. ambassador to die in the line of duty
List of U.S. ambassadors killed in office

References

External links
Gerald Ford statement upon Davies' death
Vanderbilt Television News Archives

1921 births
1974 deaths
Ambassadors of the United States to Cyprus
Assassinated American diplomats
People from Berkeley, California
United States Army personnel of World War II
Military personnel from California
American terrorism victims
Terrorism deaths in Cyprus
American people murdered abroad
People murdered in Cyprus
Deaths by firearm in Cyprus
1970s murders in Cyprus
1974 crimes in Cyprus
1974 murders in Asia
1974 murders in Europe
United States Foreign Service personnel
United States Army officers
American expatriates in Cyprus